Jean-François Lisée (born February 13, 1958) is a Quebec nationalist politician who served as the leader of the Parti Québécois from October 2016 until October 2018. He was first elected a member of the National Assembly of Quebec in the 2012 Quebec election in the electoral district of Rosemont.

Prior to winning political office, he was a political analyst, journalist, author, intellectual and sovereignist thinker. He was a "special advisor" to former PQ premiers of Quebec Jacques Parizeau and Lucien Bouchard. Prior to his election he was the executive director of the International Study and Research Centre at the University of Montreal. His work centred on Quebec sovereignty, the sociological phenomena affecting the latter's support, as well as the "Quebec Model" and social democracy in an era of globalization.

He served concurrently as the Minister of International Relations, the Francophonie, External Trade as well as the minister responsible for the Montreal region in the cabinet of Pauline Marois from 2012 to 2014.

Lisée formally entered Parti Québécois leadership election in May 2016, saying he would not campaign for sovereignty in his first mandate as premier. He was elected leader of the PQ on October 7, winning 50.63% of the ballots during the second round.

He resigned as Parti Québécois leader after his party's fourth-place result in the 2018 election, in which he lost his own seat in Rosemont to Vincent Marissal.

Biography 

Lisée is the son of Andrée Goulet of Thetford Mines.

Lisée holds a licentiate in laws from the Université de Montréal, a master in communication studies from the UQAM and a degree in journalism from the Centre de formation des journalistes in Paris. In the 1980s, he was a reporter in Paris and Washington for both Canadian and French media. During that decade, he began an expansive investigation into 30 years of American political, diplomatic, financial and media attention toward Quebec and its independence movement, resulting in the book In the Eye of the Eagle, published in 1990. It won the Governor General's Award for non-fiction. Two books followed: Le Tricheur ("The Cheater") and Le Naufrageur ("The Wrecker"), both of which were highly critical of former Quebec Premier Robert Bourassa. According to Lisée, Bourassa's refusal to support sovereignty after making a turn toward Quebec nationalism after the failure of the Meech Lake Accord left many sovereignists feeling betrayed.  Bourassa was outraged by the title of the first book and never spoke to Lisée again.

In 1994, he became a "special advisor" to nationalist Premier Jacques Parizeau and an important strategist for the 1995 Quebec referendum campaign. After the sovereignty referendum failure and Parizeau's resulting resignation, Lisée then became advisor to Parizeau's successor, Lucien Bouchard. Lisée resigned from this post in late 1999 because of disagreements over the sovereignty strategy of the provincial PQ government. He explained his own strategy in 'Emergency Exit: How to Avert Quebec Decline (2000).

Lisée was guest scholar from 2001 to 2003 at the International Research and Study Centre (CERI) in Paris and at the Political Science Department of the University of Montreal. He was the Executive Director of the International Studies Centre at the University of Montreal (CERIUM) from 2004 to 2012. He is also a member of the Political Research and Social Development Centre (CPDS) and founder of international politics website PolitiquesSociales.net. He periodically writes articles published in the current affairs magazine L'actualité.

 Controversy 

In 2016, while he was running for leadership of the PQ, Lisée stated that if elected Premier of Quebec, he would ban Muslim veils in public spaces and claimed that Muslim women could hide machine guns under their burkas.

In September 26, 2016, Lisée stated that Quebec needed the "best immigration possible" and named Spain, France, and Belgium as examples of sources of potential immigrants. Many thought that because those were well-developed countries, Lisée felt that they could integrate into Quebec's society more easily. A fellow PQ member Maka Kotto, an immigrant from Cameroon, criticized Lisée's comments.

In 2018, Lisée said he wanted a fence to be built near a Quebec-New York border crossing that is popular with asylum-seekers.

 Bibliography 

 Qui veut la peau du Parti québécois?: et autres secrets de la politique et des médias. 2019.  Montréal : La boîte à Lisée : Carte blanche.  
 Des histoires du Québec selon Jean-François Lisée. 2012. Montréal : Les Éditions Rogers
 Le petit tricheur: Robert Bourassa derrière le masque. 2012. Montréal : Les Éditions Québec-Amérique. 
 Comment mettre la droite K.-O. en 15 arguments. 2012. Montréal : Les Éditions Stanké. 
 Troisième millénaire. 2011. Montréal : Les Éditions Stanké. 
 Imaginer l'Après-crise: Pistes pour un monde plus juste, équitable, durable. 2009. Montréal : Les Éditions du Boréal. 
 Pour une gauche efficace. 2008. Montréal : Les Éditions du Boréal. 
 Nous. 2007. Montréal : Les Éditions du Boréal. 
 Sortie de Secours : Comment échapper au déclin du Québec. 2000. Montréal : Les Éditions du Boréal. 
 Le Naufrageur. 1994. Montréal : Les Éditions du Boréal. 
 Le Tricheur. 1994. Montréal : Les Éditions du Boréal. 
 Les Prétendants. 1993. Montréal : Les Éditions du Boréal. 
 Carrefours Amérique. 1990. Montréal : Les Éditions du Boréal. 
 Dans l'œil de l'Aigle.'' 1990. Montréal : Les Éditions du Boréal.

Awards 
 Governor General's Award (1990)
 Jules-Fournier Award (1990)

Electoral record

See also 
List of Université de Montréal people
Quebec sovereignty movement
Social democracy
Parti Québécois

References

External links 
His daily blog 
Biography and article archive  on the CÉRIUM website

1958 births
French Quebecers
Governor General's Award-winning non-fiction writers
Living people
Members of the Executive Council of Quebec
People from Thetford Mines
Writers from Quebec
Journalists from Quebec
Political consultants from Quebec
Canadian writers in French
Parti Québécois MNAs
Leaders of the Parti Québécois
21st-century Canadian politicians
Université du Québec à Montréal alumni